The Jewish Museum of Venice is a museum focusing on the history of Jews in the city of Venice.

History
The Jewish Museum of Venice was founded in 1953 by Cesare Vivante and rabbis Elio Toaff and Bruno Polacco. It was established at the request of Giovannina Reinisch Sullam and Aldo Fortis. The museum was dedicated to Vittorio Fano, president of the Jewish Community of Venice from 1945 to 1959. Its original purpose remains the same as today. 

The museum is located in between the Great German Synagogue and the Canton Synagogue, the two oldest Venetian synagogues. The Museum also organises tours of the synagogues in Venice.

Collection
The museum includes the following objects in its collection:

 Hannukiahs (Hanukkah menorahs or candelabras)
 jugs and handbasins used by priests
 prayer bookbinding
 A collection of textiles

Bookshop
Inside the museum, a bookshop is located. The books found there describe Jewish  religion, history, and art.

References

Jewish history
Jewish museums in Italy
Jews and Judaism in Venice
Museums in Venice